"Days" is a song by Japanese rock band High and Mighty Color. It was released as the fourth and final single from the band's debut album G∞ver on August 17, 2005.

Overview
"Days" is the band's fourth single. Like "Run Run Run", it is more pop oriented than previous singles and more of a ballad. There are two music videos for "Days", one focusing more on the band as a whole, while the other focuses more on Yuusuke. The official site describes the song as a closing to the end of summer vacation.

Track list
 "Days" – 4:02
 "Seek" – 4:22

All songs written by HIGH and MIGHTY COLOR.

Personnel
 Maakii & Yuusuke — vocals
 Kazuto — guitar
 MEG — guitar
 macKaz — bass
 SASSY — drums

Production
 Hide2 (Norishrocks) – creative & art direction

Charts
Oricon Sales Chart (Japan)

References

2005 singles
Days
2005 songs